Dispilio is a village near Lake Orestiada, in the Kastoria regional unit of Western Macedonia, Greece. Near the village is an archaeological site containing remains of a Neolithic lakeshore settlement that occupied an artificial island.

History
The lake settlement was discovered during the dry winter of 1932, which lowered the lake level and revealed traces of the settlement. A preliminary survey was made in 1935 by Antonios Keramopoulos. Excavations began in 1992, led by George Chourmouziadis, professor of prehistoric archaeology at the Aristotle University of Thessaloniki. A recreation of the lake dwellers' settlement has been erected near the site to attract tourists from Greece and abroad.

The site appears to have been occupied over a long period, from the final stages of the Middle Neolithic (5600-5000 BC) to the Final Neolithic (3000 BC). A number of items were found, including ceramics, wooden structural elements, seeds, bones, figurines, personal ornaments, flutes and a wooden tablet with markings on it, the Dispilio Tablet.

See also
 Orestis (region)
 Upper Macedonia

References

Further reading
G. H. Chourmouziadis, ed., Dispilio, 7500 Years After. Thessaloniki, 2002.
G. H. Chourmouziadis,  Ανασκαφής Εγκόλπιον. Athens, 2006.

External links 
 
Dispilio: The Lakeshore Prehistoric Settlement of Greece from greekreporter.com (in English)
Neolithic Lake Settlement of Dispilio from greek-crossroads.gr (in Greek)
Dispilio Excavations Official Website, Aristotle University of Thessaloniki, Macedonia, Greece
 Dispilio, Exhibition of prehistoric finds from museumsofmacedonia.gr (in English)
 The excavation's journal, Anaskamma, is available at anaskamma.wordpress.com
The Neolithic Settlement of Dispilio from istorikakastorias.blogspot.com (in Greek)

Populated places established in the 6th millennium BC
Neolithic settlements in Macedonia (region)
Populated places in Kastoria (regional unit)
Pre-Indo-Europeans
Populated places in ancient Greece
Ancient artificial islands in Greece
Former populated places in Greece
Populated places disestablished in the 3rd millennium BC
6th-millennium BC establishments
3rd-millennium BC disestablishments
Archaeological sites in Macedonia (Greece)